Dominika Piątkowska (born March 12, 1986 in Łódź) is a Polish former competitive pair skater and ladies' single skater. She teamed up with Dmitri Khromin in 2002. They are the 2005-2007 Polish national champions (Dorota Zagorska and Mariusz Siudek did not compete those years).

She previously competed with Alexander Levintsov and Marcin Świątek.

Competitive highlights

With Khromin

With Swiatek

With Levintsov

External links

 
 

Living people
Polish female pair skaters
Sportspeople from Łódź
1986 births